William George Wagner (December 25, 1887 in Lilley, Michigan – October 2, 1967 in Muskegon, Michigan) was a pitcher in Major League Baseball. He pitched from 1913 to 1914. He also gave up Cy Williams's first career home run, making him the first player in MLB history to give up a homer to someone who would eventually hit 200 or more homers (Williams finished his career with 251).

External links

1887 births
1967 deaths
Baseball players from Michigan
Major League Baseball pitchers
Brooklyn Superbas players
Brooklyn Robins players
Toronto Maple Leafs (International League) players
Muskegon Reds players